James Clark (born 5 September 2001) is an English professional footballer who plays as a full back for Beaconsfield Town.

Career
Clark began his career at Queens Park Rangers at the age of 9, later moving to Brentford at the age of 12 before playing with Leatherhead and Chelsea. He left Chelsea in the summer of 2020, signing with Wycombe Wanderers in November 2020 following a trial on a contract until the end of the 2020–21 season. On 12 May 2021 it was announced that his contract would be extended for a further 6 months. On 26 November 2021, Clark joined Southern League Premier Division South side Beaconsfield Town on loan until 3 January 2022. On 5 January 2022, Clark left Wycombe Wanderers following the expiration of his contract.

On 17 January 2022, Clark returned to Beaconsfield Town on a permanent basis.

References

2001 births
Living people
English footballers
Queens Park Rangers F.C. players
Brentford F.C. players
Leatherhead F.C. players
Chelsea F.C. players
Wycombe Wanderers F.C. players
Beaconsfield Town F.C. players
Association football fullbacks